Prosoplus dentatus is a species of beetle in the family Cerambycidae. It was described by Olivier in 1792. It is known from Mauritius, Seychelles, Réunion, and Madagascar. It contains the varietas Prosoplus dentatus var. ochreomaculatus.

References

Prosoplus
Beetles described in 1792